Seebenstein is a town in the district of Neunkirchen in the Austrian state of Lower Austria. It is often called the "Pearl of the Pitten valley" ("Perle des Pittentals") due to its preserved nature.

Geography
Seebenstein is in the industrial quarter of Lower Austria.  The town covers 9.09 square kilometers and is 62.71 percent forested.  The town includes the Seebenstein nature park and it borders the historic ruin of the Türkensturz.  The town is overlooked by the medieval castle Burg Seebenstein.

History
In ancient times, Seebenstein was part of the Celtic kingdom of Noricum. 

On April 16th 1972, Seebenstein was the center of a magnitude 5.3 earthquake

Historical population

Demographics
In the 2001 census the population was described as 84.4% Roman Catholic, 3.8% evangelical, 0.5% Muslim, 0.3% Orthodox Christian, and 9.4% with no religion.
Additional to the current population of 1470, around 500 people have a summer house in Seebenstein.

References

Cities and towns in Neunkirchen District, Austria
Bucklige Welt